Hunted City is a 1979 Italian poliziottesco film directed by Stelvio Massi. It represents one of the few negative roles for Merola.

Production
Hunted City was the fifth collaboration between actor Maurizio Merli and director Stelvio Massi. The film was shot at Incet-de Paolis in Milan and on location in Milano.

Cast 
 Maurizio Merli: Commissioner Paolo Ferro
 Mario Merola: Raffaele Acampora
 Carmen Scarpitta: Ferro's sister
 Francisco Rabal: don Alfonso 
 Massimo Dapporto: Stefano

Release
Hunted City was distributed theatrically in Italy by Simba Film on 27 September 1979. The film grossed a total of 329 million Italian lire domestically.

See also
 List of Italian films of 1979

References

Footnotes

Sources

External links

1979 films
Poliziotteschi films
Films scored by Stelvio Cipriani
1979 crime films
Films shot in Milan
1970s Italian films

Films directed by Stelvio Massi